Judy Turner was an author who wrote under the pen name Katie Flynn. Her stories were inspired by hearing family recollections of life in Liverpool during the early twentieth century, and according to her publisher, her books sold more than eight million copies. She died in January 2019, aged 82.

Biography
Flynn was born in Norwich, and lived in Wrexham after her marriage.  She started her career by writing short stories and articles.  She had over 90 novels published under various pseudonyms.  She continued to write after being diagnosed with myalgic encephalomyelitis, with her daughter Holly working as her assistant. She died on 1 January 2019, aged 82. She had 4 children.

Selected works
Darkest Before Dawn (1988)
Tales for Christmas: Free festive tasters to warm your heart (2013)
Christmas at Tuppenny Corner (2018)
A Mother's Love (2019)

References

External links
 Random House
 Fantastic Fiction

1936 births
2019 deaths
People with chronic fatigue syndrome
British romantic fiction writers
British historical novelists